Mahalakotuwa is a village in Sri Lanka. It is located within Central Province.

See also
List of towns in Central Province, Sri Lanka

External links

The first evillage in Central province www.evillahe.lk/mahalakotuwa

Populated places in Matale District